Emmanouil Tombazis (1784–1831) was a Greek naval captain from Hydra, active during the Greek War of Independence, who was appointed Commissioner of Crete for the Greek provisional government in 1823–1824 and naval minister for a short period in 1828.

The Tombazis family migrated from Vourla to the island of Hydra in 1668. It was originally named Yakoumakis. Emmanouil Tombazis was the son of Nikolaos Tombazis and brother of Iakovos Tombazis. During the early years of the War of Independence, he participated in several naval battles and served as a representative for his native island in the national assemblies of Epidaurus and Astros.

Appointed Commissioner for Crete in early 1823, he arrived on the island on 21 May 1823 at the fort of Kissamos with a small fleet of five warships, three transports and 600, mostly Epirote, volunteers. His arrival gave new impetus and hope to Cretan insurgents, notably since the Ottoman Turks at the fort surrendered shortly after his arrival, on May 25, and this was followed by other victories.

However, Tombazis was criticised for his delay in organising a military force to repel the expected arrival of 12,000 Turkish-Egyptian soldiers under the command of Hussein Bey, a son-in-law of Muhammad Ali of Egypt. When he finally gathered 3,000 insurgents at Gergeri they were no match for the larger and better-trained force at the battle of Amourgelles on 20 August 1823.

In 1828 he was appointed by Governor Ioannis Kapodistrias as Minister for Naval Affairs, but resigned shortly after when he disagreed with his policies.

He died at Hydra in 1831, leaving behind a son, Nikolaos (1815–1896).

References

Sources

External link

1784 births
1831 deaths
Greek military leaders of the Greek War of Independence
Greek revolutionaries
Modern history of Crete
Ministers of Naval Affairs of Greece
People from Hydra (island)